Johanna Meisel was a German film editor. She edited fifty six films between 1940 and 1962.

Selected filmography
 Commissioner Eyck (1940)
 Clarissa (1941)
 Peter Voss, Thief of Millions (1946)
 Street Acquaintances (1948)
 Don't Play with Love (1949)
 Quartet of Five (1949)
 Don't Dream, Annette (1949)
 The Appeal to Conscience (1949)
 The Orplid Mystery (1950)
 Five Suspects (1950)
 Dark Eyes (1951)
 Wedding in the Hay (1951)
 Queen of the Night (1951)
 All Clues Lead to Berlin (1952)
 The Chaste Libertine (1952)
 You Only Live Once (1952)
 Love's Awakening (1953)
 The Uncle from America (1953)
 The Seven Dresses of Katrin (1954)
 The Ambassador's Wife (1955)
 The Spanish Fly (1955)
 When the Alpine Roses Bloom  (1955)
 Son Without a Home (1955)
 Your Life Guards (1955)
 The Priest from Kirchfeld (1955)
 Beneath the Palms on the Blue Sea (1956)
 The Tour Guide of Lisbon (1956)
 As Long as the Roses Bloom (1956)
 Greetings and Kisses from Tegernsee (1957)
 All Roads Lead Home (1957)
 The Star of Santa Clara (1958)
 The Csardas King (1958)
 Mandolins and Moonlight (1959)

References

Bibliography
 Rolf Giesen. Nazi Propaganda Films: A History and Filmography. McFarland, 2003.

External links

Year of birth unknown
Year of death unknown
German film editors
German women film editors